WFTF (90.9 MHz, "Air 1") is an FM radio station licensed to Rutland, Vermont and affiliated with the Educational Media Foundation's Air1 network. The station is owned by Christian Ministries, Inc.

Translators
WFTF's programming is also heard on translator stations on 94.9 in Burlington, Vermont and 106.5 in Montpelier.

References

External links
The Light Radio Network's official website

FTF
Air1 radio stations
Radio stations established in 1987
1987 establishments in Vermont